CBS Records may refer to:

 CBS Records, a former name of Sony Music, a global music company
 CBS/Sony, a former name of Sony Music Entertainment Japan, a Japanese music company division of Sony
 CBS Records International, a label for Columbia Records recordings released outside North America from 1962 to 1990
 CBS Records (2006), founded in 2006 by CBS Corporation for recordings featured its programs
 CBS Associated Records, a CBS imprint label in the 1980s to early 1990s
 CBS Masterworks Records, the former name of Sony Classical Records
 CBS Discos, the former name of Sony Music Latin

See also
CBS (disambiguation)